Estrogen receptors (ERs) are a group of proteins found inside cells. They are receptors that are activated by the hormone estrogen (17β-estradiol). Two classes of ER exist: nuclear estrogen receptors (ERα and ERβ), which are members of the nuclear receptor family of intracellular receptors, and membrane estrogen receptors (mERs) (GPER (GPR30), ER-X, and Gq-mER), which are mostly G protein-coupled receptors. This article refers to the former (ER).

Once activated by estrogen, the ER is able to translocate into the nucleus and bind to DNA to regulate the activity of different genes (i.e. it is a DNA-binding transcription factor). However, it also has additional functions independent of DNA binding.

As hormone receptors for sex steroids (steroid hormone receptors), ERs, androgen receptors (ARs), and progesterone receptors (PRs) are important in sexual maturation and gestation.

Proteomics
Hormone-activated estrogen receptors form dimers, and, since the two forms are coexpressed in many cell types, the receptors may form ERα (αα) or ERβ (ββ) homodimers or ERαβ (αβ) heterodimers.
Estrogen receptor alpha and beta show significant overall sequence homology, and both are composed of five domains designated A/B through F (listed from the N- to C-terminus; amino acid sequence numbers refer to human ER).

The N-terminal A/B domain is able to transactivate gene transcription in the absence of bound ligand (e.g., the estrogen hormone). While this region is able to activate gene transcription without ligand, this activation is weak and more selective compared to the activation provided by the E domain. The C domain, also known as the DNA-binding domain, binds to estrogen response elements in DNA. The D domain is a hinge region that connects the C and E domains.  The E domain contains the ligand binding cavity as well as binding sites for coactivator and corepressor proteins. The E-domain in the presence of bound ligand is able to activate gene transcription. The C-terminal F domain function is not entirely clear and is variable in length.

Due to alternative RNA splicing, several ER isoforms are known to exist. At least three ERα and five ERβ isoforms have been identified. The ERβ isoforms receptor subtypes can transactivate transcription only when a heterodimer with the functional ERß1 receptor of 59 kDa is formed. The ERß3 receptor was detected at high levels in the testis. The two other ERα isoforms are 36 and 46kDa.

Only in fish, but not in humans, an ERγ receptor has been described.

Genetics 

Distribution 
Both ERs are widely expressed in different tissue types, however there are some notable differences in their expression patterns:
 The ERα is found in endometrium, breast cancer cells, ovarian stromal cells, and the hypothalamus. In males, ERα protein is found in the epithelium of the efferent ducts.
 The expression of the ERβ protein has been documented in ovarian granulosa cells, kidney, brain, bone, heart, lungs, intestinal mucosa, prostate, and endothelial cells.
The ERs are regarded to be cytoplasmic receptors in their unliganded state, but visualization research has shown that only a small fraction of the ERs reside in the cytoplasm, with most ER constitutively in the nucleus.
The "ERα" primary transcript gives rise to several alternatively spliced variants of unknown function.

Ligands

Agonists
 Endogenous estrogens (e.g., estradiol, estrone, estriol, estetrol)
 Natural estrogens (e.g., conjugated estrogens)
 Synthetic estrogens (e.g., ethinylestradiol, diethylstilbestrol)

Mixed (agonist and antagonist mode of action)
 Phytoestrogens (e.g., coumestrol, daidzein, genistein, miroestrol)
 Selective estrogen receptor modulators (e.g., tamoxifen, clomifene, raloxifene)

Antagonists
 Antiestrogens (e.g., fulvestrant, ICI-164384, ethamoxytriphetol)

Affinities

Binding and functional selectivity
The ER's helix 12 domain plays a crucial role in determining interactions with coactivators and corepressors and, therefore, the respective agonist or antagonist effect of the ligand.

Different ligands may differ in their affinity for alpha and beta isoforms of the estrogen receptor:
 estradiol binds equally well to both receptors
 estrone, and raloxifene bind preferentially to the alpha receptor
 estriol, and genistein to the beta receptor

Subtype selective estrogen receptor modulators preferentially bind to either the α- or the β-subtype of the receptor. In addition, the different estrogen receptor combinations may respond differently to various ligands, which may translate into tissue selective agonistic and antagonistic effects. The ratio of α- to β- subtype concentration has been proposed to play a role in certain diseases.

The concept of selective estrogen receptor modulators is based on the ability to promote ER interactions with different proteins such as transcriptional coactivator or corepressors. Furthermore, the ratio of coactivator to corepressor protein varies in different tissues.  As a consequence, the same ligand may be an agonist in some tissue (where coactivators predominate) while antagonistic in other tissues (where corepressors dominate). Tamoxifen, for example, is an antagonist in breast and is, therefore, used as a breast cancer treatment but an ER agonist in bone (thereby preventing osteoporosis) and a partial agonist in the endometrium (increasing the risk of uterine cancer).

Signal transduction 
Since estrogen is a steroidal hormone, it can pass through the phospholipid membranes of the cell, and receptors therefore do not need to be membrane-bound in order to bind with estrogen.

Genomic 
In the absence of hormone, estrogen receptors are largely located in the cytosol. Hormone binding to the receptor triggers a number of events starting with migration of the receptor from the cytosol into the nucleus, dimerization of the receptor, and subsequent binding of the receptor dimer to specific sequences of DNA known as hormone response elements. The DNA/receptor complex then recruits other proteins that are responsible for the transcription of downstream DNA into mRNA and finally protein that results in a change in cell function. Estrogen receptors also occur within the cell nucleus, and both estrogen receptor subtypes have a DNA-binding domain and can function as transcription factors to regulate the production of proteins.

The receptor also interacts with activator protein 1 and Sp-1 to promote transcription, via several coactivators such as PELP-1.

Direct acetylation of the estrogen receptor alpha at the lysine residues in hinge region by p300 regulates transactivation and hormone sensitivity.

Non-genomic 
Some estrogen receptors associate with the cell surface membrane and can be rapidly activated by exposure of cells to estrogen.

In addition, some ER may associate with cell membranes by attachment to caveolin-1 and form complexes with G proteins, striatin, receptor tyrosine kinases (e.g., EGFR and IGF-1), and non-receptor tyrosine kinases (e.g., Src).  Through striatin, some of this membrane bound ER may lead to increased levels of Ca2+ and nitric oxide (NO).  Through the receptor tyrosine kinases, signals are sent to the nucleus through the mitogen-activated protein kinase (MAPK/ERK) pathway and phosphoinositide 3-kinase (Pl3K/AKT) pathway.  Glycogen synthase kinase-3 (GSK)-3β inhibits transcription by nuclear ER by inhibiting phosphorylation of serine 118 of nuclear ERα. Phosphorylation of GSK-3β removes its inhibitory effect, and this can be achieved by the PI3K/AKT pathway and the MAPK/ERK pathway, via rsk.

17β-Estradiol has been shown to activate the G protein-coupled receptor GPR30. However the subcellular localization and role of this receptor are still object of controversy.

Disease

Cancer 
Estrogen receptors are over-expressed in around 70% of breast cancer cases, referred to as "ER-positive", and can be demonstrated in such tissues using immunohistochemistry. Two hypotheses have been proposed to explain why this causes tumorigenesis, and the available evidence suggests that both mechanisms contribute:
 First, binding of estrogen to the ER stimulates proliferation of mammary cells, with the resulting increase in cell division and DNA replication, leading to mutations.
 Second, estrogen metabolism produces genotoxic waste.

The result of both processes is disruption of cell cycle, apoptosis and DNA repair, which increases the chance of tumour formation. ERα is certainly associated with more differentiated tumours, while evidence that ERβ is involved is controversial. Different versions of the ESR1 gene have been identified (with single-nucleotide polymorphisms) and are associated with different risks of developing breast cancer.

Estrogen and the ERs have also been implicated in breast cancer, ovarian cancer, colon cancer, prostate cancer, and endometrial cancer. Advanced colon cancer is associated with a loss of ERβ, the predominant ER in colon tissue, and colon cancer is treated with ERβ-specific agonists.

Endocrine therapy for breast cancer involves selective estrogen receptor modulators (SERMS), such as tamoxifen, which behave as ER antagonists in breast tissue, or aromatase inhibitors, such as anastrozole. ER status is used to determine sensitivity of breast cancer lesions to tamoxifen and aromatase inhibitors.  Another SERM, raloxifene, has been used as a preventive chemotherapy for women judged to have a high risk of developing breast cancer.    Another chemotherapeutic anti-estrogen, ICI 182,780 (Faslodex), which acts as a complete antagonist, also promotes degradation of the estrogen receptor.

However, de novo resistance to endocrine therapy undermines the efficacy of using competitive inhibitors like tamoxifen. Hormone deprivation through the use of aromatase inhibitors is also rendered futile. Massively parallel genome sequencing has revealed the common presence of point mutations on ESR1 that are drivers for resistance, and promote the agonist conformation of ERα without the bound ligand. Such constitutive, estrogen-independent activity is driven by specific mutations, such as the D538G or Y537S/C/N mutations, in the ligand binding domain of ESR1 and promote cell proliferation and tumor progression without hormone stimulation.

Menopause 
The metabolic effects of estrogen in postmenopausal women has been linked to the genetic polymorphism of estrogen receptor beta (ER-β).

Aging 
Studies in female mice have shown that estrogen receptor-alpha declines in the pre-optic hypothalamus as they grow old. Female mice that were given a calorically restricted diet during the majority of their lives maintained higher levels of ERα in the pre-optic hypothalamus than their non-calorically restricted counterparts.

Obesity 
A dramatic demonstration of the importance of estrogens in the regulation of fat deposition comes from transgenic mice that were genetically engineered to lack a functional aromatase gene. These mice have very low levels of estrogen and are obese. Obesity was also observed in estrogen deficient female mice lacking the follicle-stimulating hormone receptor. The effect of low estrogen on increased obesity has been linked to estrogen receptor alpha.

SERMs for other treatment purposes 
SERMs are also being studied for the treatment of uterine fibroids and endometriosis.

Discovery 
Estrogen receptors were first identified by Elwood V. Jensen at the University of Chicago in 1958, for which Jensen was awarded the Lasker Award. The gene for a second estrogen receptor (ERβ) was identified in 1996 by Kuiper et al. in rat prostate and ovary using degenerate ERalpha primers.

See also 
 Membrane estrogen receptor
 Estrogen insensitivity syndrome
 Aromatase deficiency
 Aromatase excess syndrome

References

External links 
 
 

Human female endocrine system
3